The Ciel Tower is a skyscraper under construction in Dubai in the United Arab Emirates. At over 360 meters high, the tower will be the tallest hotel-only building in the world when completed.

Architecture and planning 
The skyscraper is being built according to plans by the Dubai-based architectural firm NORR in the Dubai Marina district in the immediate vicinity of the sea. The sculpture-like design is characterized by tapers in the upper and lower parts of the building, a silver-colored facade and concise recesses in the upper part of the building. A bar and infinity pool will be located there.

Over 1,042 rooms, including 150 suites, are to be spread across the tower's 82 floors.

Approximately 12,000 cubic meters of concrete and over 3000 tons of steel were used for the skyscraper's foundation.

Completion is scheduled for 2023. It should open in 2024

References

External links
 Ciel Tower

Hotels in Dubai
Skyscraper hotels in Dubai